Hubert Leslie Primrose (14 November 1882 – 26 November 1942) was an Australian politician.

Early life
He was born at Cootamundra to public servant Charles Herman Burton Primrose and Sarah Maria, née Clissold. After a private education he studied law. On 26 October 1910 he married Edith Briton, with whom he had four children. Admitted as a solicitor in 1917, he was a partner in Lee & Primrose (1917–27), which later became Primrose & Primrose (1930–42).

Political career
He served on North Sydney Council from 1919 to 1938, with a period as mayor from 1926 to 1932. As mayor he was responsible for officially opening the Sydney Harbour Bridge's northern approach on 19 March 1932.

He was elected to the New South Wales Legislative Assembly in 1932 as the United Australia Party member for North Sydney. An assistant minister from 1939 to 1941, he was acting Minister for Health for several periods in 1939 and 1940. Defeated in 1941, Primrose died at Waverton the following year.

References

 

1882 births
1942 deaths
United Australia Party members of the Parliament of New South Wales
Members of the New South Wales Legislative Assembly
Australian solicitors
20th-century Australian politicians
Mayors of North Sydney